Caluyanon is a regional Western Bisayan language spoken in the Semirara Island Group, Caluya, Antique in the Philippines. Most of its speakers use either Kinaray-a or Hiligaynon as their second language.

References

Visayan languages
Languages of Antique (province)